The Château de Cazeneuve is a castle, converted into a comfortable château, in the commune of Préchac in the Gironde département of France.

The castle was built along the gorges of the River Ciron and the stream of Honburens.

History
The early castle was the former residence of the Kings of Navarre, the property of King Henri IV. It was built by Amanieu VII d'Albret on a rocky bank. It included in its enclosure the medieval mound of the 11th century preceded by a vast courtyard whose curtain walls protected the town.

Due to financial problems King Henri sells the castle in 1583.

In the 17th century, the building underwent a major overhaul. The medieval castle was then transformed into a pleasant and ceremonial château. It has since been restored regularly.

It was classified as a monument historique on 24 September 1965.

The castle still belongs to the Sabran-Pontevès family, descendants of the d'Albrets

Architecture 
The site is made up of troglodyte caves under the castle and large underground medieval cellars.

The old parts are the advanced fortifications and the moats.

The buildings are a reconstruction dating from the 17th century.

The royal apartments are period furnished.

Park and gardens
The wooded park runs along the Ciron and includes the lake, the mill, the wash house and the bird island. The part between the Ciron, the tributary of the Ciron and the CD 9 road is classified as a historic monument in the same way as the castle.

Gallery

See also
List of castles in France

References

External links

 Ministry of Culture listing for Château de Cazeneuve, with photos  
 Château de Cazeneuve official web site
 History and photos at Castleland

Castles in Nouvelle-Aquitaine
Châteaux in Gironde
Monuments historiques of Gironde